Kosta Savić (born 15 December 1987) is a Bosnian handball player. Savić started his career in Lokomotiva Brčko, and later played for Slovenian club Krško, Bosna Sarajevo and French club PAUC handball.

References

External links

1987 births
Living people
Bosnia and Herzegovina male handball players
Mediterranean Games competitors for Bosnia and Herzegovina
Competitors at the 2009 Mediterranean Games